Georg Wilhelm von Driesen (8 June 1700 in Klein-Gilgehnen– 2 November 1758 in Dresden) was a lieutenant general in Frederick the Great's Prussian army and a county commission of Osterrode (Ostróda).  Suffering from gout, he sought a cure in Dresden and died there in 1758. He fought in the Seven Years' War and  the War of Austrian Succession. After the Prussians were defeated at the Battle of Breslau, his regiment joined with Frederick's army at Leuthen, where he participated in the Prussian victory by attacking the left wing of the Austrian force. He subsequently helped to chase the Austrian force back to Bohemia.

1700 births
1758 deaths
Prussian military personnel of the Seven Years' War
Lieutenant generals of Prussia